"Love Hurts" is the third Europe single from Incubus' sixth album, Light Grenades, and is the fourth U.S. single ("Oil And Water" was released as the third single in the U.S.). The song received moderate airplay in European countries. The single was released for airplay in the United States over a year after the previous single, "Oil and Water", and nearly two years following the album's release. It became a surprise hit for the band in the U.S., topping the Billboard Modern Rock Tracks chart, becoming their fourth song to do so. It was officially released on October 7, 2008.

There is an acoustic version of "Love Hurts" available for those who buy the "Anna Molly" single, or those who bought the Best Buy Light Grenades three-track promo.

Band members

Brandon Boyd- lead vocals
Mike Eizinger- guitar
Ben Kenney- bass
Chris Kilmore- keyboards
Jose Pasillas- drums

Meaning
In a 2007 interview with Incubus, Brandon Boyd expressed his thoughts on the song:

Music video
An unofficial video from a live concert (with audio of the studio track dubbed over the live performance) was released for the song on March 23, 2007. No official video was made for this song.

Track listing

Single
"Love Hurts" (Album version)
"Anna-Molly"
"Drive"
"Love Hurts" (Video)

Promo single
"Love Hurts"
"Anna-Molly"

Chart performance

"Love Hurts" was released to alternative radio in October 2008, and hit number one on Billboard'''s Hot Modern Rock Tracks chart for the week ending February 21, 2009. It joins "Drive", "Megalomaniac", and "Anna Molly" as one of four songs by the band to top the chart, and their only secondary single from an album era to accomplish this feat. It outpeaked previous singles from Light Grenades'', "Oil And Water" and "Dig". It has also reached number one on Mediabase's Alternative airplay chart. It has charted on the Bubbling Under Hot 100 Singles at #13 (equivalent to #113 on the Billboard Hot 100).

Charts

Weekly charts

Year-end charts

References

2006 songs
2008 singles
Incubus (band) songs
Song recordings produced by Brendan O'Brien (record producer)
Songs written by Brandon Boyd
Songs written by Mike Einziger
Songs written by Ben Kenney
Songs written by Chris Kilmore
Songs written by José Pasillas
Epic Records singles